

Champions
National League: Brooklyn Superbas

National League final standings

Statistical leaders

Events
May 15 – Willie Keeler, known as one of the smallest players and best bunters in baseball, drives the ball past startled left fielder Ed Delahanty of the Philadelphia Phillies for an inside-the-park grand slam and an 8–5 victory for the Brooklyn Superbas.
May 25 – Deacon Phillippe of the Louisville Colonels pitches a 7–0 no-hitter against the New York Giants.
June 2 – The Cleveland Spiders blow a 10–0 lead, eventually losing 11–10 to the Brooklyn Superbas.
July 1 – The Pittsburgh Pirates purchase the contract of pitcher Jack Chesbro from the Richmond Giants of the Atlantic League.
August 7 –  Vic Willis leads the Boston Beaneaters to a 7–1 victory by pitching a no-hitter against the Washington Senators.
September 12 – The Cleveland Spiders lose both games of a doubleheader against the Philadelphia Phillies. At 19–114, they break the record for most losses by an MLB team in a single season, which had previously been 113.
October 11 - Magnates of the Western League agree to reorganize themselves into the American League. 
October 15 - The Cleveland Spiders lose both games of their season-ending doubleheader against the Cincinnati Reds by scores of 16-1 and 19–3. Having lost 40 of their last 41 games, they finish the season in last place with a record of 20–134.

Buck Freeman of the Washington Senators leads all batters with 25 home runs during the regular season, more than double hit by Bobby Wallace of the St. Louis Perfectos, who finished with 12 homers. Although Freeman failed to equal the record of 27 home runs set by Ned Williamson in the  season, his total is generally regarded as the greater achievement owing to the dimensions of Williamson's home ballpark of Lakeshore Park – Only two of the 27 homers batted by Williamson for the Chicago White Stockings were scored away from home. Freeman's tally was not surpassed until , when Babe Ruth belted 29 home runs for the Boston Red Sox.

Following the season, the Baltimore Orioles, Cleveland Spiders, Louisville Colonels and Washington Senators were all dropped by the National League, as a cost-cutting measure, reducing the number of teams to eight for the  season; while Louisville would never sport another major-league level team, the other three cities received charter franchises in the rival American League in 1901 – after being abandoned by the AL in 1971, the National League would return to the nation's capital 106 years later.  The National League would remain at eight teams until 1962.

Births

January
January 3 – Buzz Arlett
January 5 – Bill Hunnefield
January 5 – Bob Kinsella
January 6 – Charles Beverly
January 9 – Bill Conroy
January 11 – General Crowder
January 12 – Joe Hauser
January 13 – Cactus Keck
January 14 – Ralph Miller
January 16 – Showboat Fisher
January 17 – Tripp Sigman
January 18 – Eddie Moore
January 21 – Lew Fonseca
January 23 – Haddie Gill
January 23 – Bill Regan
January 24 – Bob Berman
January 27 – Bob Barrett
January 27 – Bibb Falk
January 29 – Scrip Lee
January 29 – Ollie Voigt
January 31 – Don Songer

February
February 6 – Walt Huntzinger
February 7 – Earl Whitehill
February 9 – Specs Toporcer
February 10 – Bill Whaley
February 13 – George Stutz
February 17 – Peahead Walker
February 24 – Pinky Pittenger
February 25 – Stan Rees
February 27 – Pat McNulty
February 28 – Lil Stoner

March
March 1 – Ernie Padgett
March 2 – George Stueland
March 4 – Dutch Kemner
March 13 – Otis Brannan
March 16 – Vic Keen
March 17 – Charlie Root
March 27 – Ed Hock
March 27 – Marty Walker
March 28 – Al Hermann
March 29 – Herb McQuaid
March 30 – Hal Rhyne
March 31 – Ed Johnson

April
April 5 – Tony Welzer
April 8 – Ted Kleinhans
April 8 – Lerton Pinto
April 10 – Rudy Kneisch
April 12 – Bernie Henderson
April 12 – Trader Horne
April 18 – Bill Bayne
April 18 – Harry Hulihan
April 29 – Frank McGee

May
May 2 – Skinny O'Neal
May 2 – Gale Staley
May 7 – Eddie Pick
May 8 – Fritz Henrich
May 10 – Freddie Maguire
May 12 – Tod Dennehey
May 14 – Earle Combs
May 23 – Frank Kelliher
May 23 – Charlie Niebergall
May 25 – Jimmie Keenan
May 28 – Bob Rice
May 29 – Hal Elliott
May 29 – Art Reinhart

June
June 1 – Al Niehaus
June 2 – Sloppy Thurston
June 3 – Urbane Pickering
June 7 – Lafayette Henion
June 11 – Horace Allen
June 14 – William Pierson
June 22 – Leo Moon
June 25 – June Greene

July
July 6 – Lenny Metz
July 9 – Fred Johnston
July 10 – Wally Kopf
July 11 – Binky Jones
July 12 – Walt French
July 16 – Nellie Pott
July 17 – Red Smith
July 19 – Joe Kiefer
July 20 – Happy Foreman
July 23 – Ed Holley
July 23 – Chuck Rowland
July 27 – Jim Faulkner
July 29 – Walter Beall

August
August 1 – Joe Shaute
August 2 – Tink Riviere
August 4 – Ski Melillo
August 5 – Sam Gibson
August 5 – Slim McGrew
August 7 – Guy Sturdy
August 7 – Ted Wingfield
August 11 – Frank Brazill
August 12 – Bill Black
August 14 – Skinny Graham
August 18 – Bernie Friberg
August 22 – Dud Lee
August 25 – Pea Ridge Day

September
September 5 – Max Bishop
September 6 – Del Bissonette
September 7 – Clarence Winters
September 8 – George Gilham
September 9 – Waite Hoyt
September 10 – Augie Johns
September 15 – Harry McCurdy
September 16 – Heinie Mueller
September 17 – Sheriff Blake
September 20 – Nelson Greene
September 20 – Karl Schnell
September 21 – Del Lundgren
September 25 – Hoge Workman

October
October 11 – Eddie Dyer
October 11 – Ernie Smith
October 12 – Bub Kuhn
October 15 – John Chapman
October 22 – Ike Kahdot
October 22 – Geechie Meredith
October 24 – Cuckoo Christensen
October 26 – Judy Johnson
October 26 – Otto Vogel
October 28 – Percy Jones

November
November 5 – Jack Wisner
November 6 – Joe Munson
November 9 – George Abrams
November 11 – Bill Vargus
November 18 – Ren Kelly
November 18 – Dutch Ulrich
November 21 – Charlie Gibson
November 21 – Augie Swentor
November 27 – Lena Styles
November 30 – Reuben Ewing

December
December 2 – Ray Morehart
December 6 – Jocko Conlan
December 7 – Ed Morris
December 10 – Verdo Elmore
December 10 – Jake Hehl
December 11 – Willie Gisentaner
December 12 – Allie Watt
December 13 – Buckshot May
December 14 – Bob Lawrence
December 18 – Sam Barnes
December 19 – Sam Dodge
December 20 – George Pipgras
December 23 – Waddy MacPhee
December 23 – Tommy Thomas
December 25 – Tom Gulley
December 25 – Gene Robertson
December 26 – Logan Drake
December 26 – Art Gardiner

Deaths

January 6 – John Smith, 40, first baseman for the Troy Trojans and Worcester Ruby Legs of the National League in the 1882 season.
January 13 – Fred Carl, 40, outfielder.
January 17 – Billy Arnold, 47, outfielder.
March 6 – Edward Santry, 38, shortstop.
March 9 – Bill McGunnigle, 44, manager who led Brooklyn to the American Association title in 1889, and the National League pennant the following year after the team switched leagues; as collegiate catcher, was possibly the first at that position to wear a glove.
March 16 – Egyptian Healy, 32, pitcher.
April 9 – Mike Moynahan, 43, shortstop.
April 24 – Pat Luby, 30, pitcher.	
July 14 – Frank Kreeger, [?], outfielder and pitcher.	
July 24 – Jim Korwan, 25, pitcher.
August 10 – Henry Buker, 40, shortstop.
September 17 – John Haldeman, 43, journalist and business manager for the Louisville Courier-Journal, who played second base in one game for the 1877 Louisville Grays.
November 2 – Tim McGinley, 45, catcher.
December 1 – Ed Gastfield, 34, catcher.
December 14 – Harry Dooms, 32, outfielder.
December 16 – Fred Waterman, 54, third baseman, member of the 1869 Cincinnati Red Stockings team that went undefeated.
December 18 – Fred Truax, 31, outfielder.

References

1899 National League season team stats at Baseball Reference